Iran competed at the 2012 Summer Paralympics in London, United Kingdom, from 29 August to 9 September 2012.

Competitors

Medalists

Archery

Men

|-
|align=left|Amin Alikhani Nezhad
|align=left|Individual recurve standing
|588
|18
|L 2–6
|colspan=5|did not advance
|-
|align=left|Ebrahim Ranjbar
|align=left rowspan=2|Individual recurve W1/W2
|648
|2
|
|W 7–1
|W 7–1
|L 5–6
|L 3–7
|4
|-
|align=left|Roham Shahabipour
|603
|7
|
|W 6–0
|L 1–7
|colspan=3|did not advance
|-
|align=left|Amin Alikhani NezhadEbrahim RanjbarRoham Shahabipour
|align=left|Team recurve open
|1839
|4
|
|
| L 192–201
|colspan=3|did not advance
|}

Women

|-
|align=left|Razieh Shir Mohammadi
|align=left rowspan=2|Individual recurve standing
|552
|5
|
|L 2–6
|colspan=4|did not advance
|-
|align=left|Zahra Javanmard
|481
|15
|L 0–6
|colspan=5|did not advance
|-
|align=left|Zahra Nemati
|align=left|Individual recurve W1/W2
|613 PR
|1
|
| W 6–0
| W 6–0
|W 6–0
|W 7–3
|
|-
|align=left|Razieh Shir MohammadiZahra JavanmardZahra Nemati
|align=left|Team recurve open
|1646
|3
|colspan=2 
| W 190–167
| L 186–192
| W 188–184
|
|}

Athletics

Men

Track events

Field events

Women

Field events

Cycling

Road

Track

Football 5-a-side

Group play

5th–8th place semi-final

5th–6th place match

Rank: 6th

Football 7-a-side

Group play

Semi-final

Bronze medal match

Rank:

Goalball

Men's tournament

Group B

Quarter-final

Judo

Powerlifting

Shooting

Women

Volleyball

Men's tournament
Overview

Roster

Group play

Quarter-final

Semi-final

Final

Swimming

Men

Table tennis

Men

Wheelchair tennis

Men

References

Nations at the 2012 Summer Paralympics
2012
2012 in Iranian sport